Kessleria fasciapennella is a moth of the  family Yponomeutidae. It is found in Great Britain, Fennoscandia, the Baltic region, Poland, Austria, Switzerland and Spain.

The wingspan is 14–18 mm. Adults are on wing from August to September and again, after overwintering, from May to June.

The larvae feed on Parnassia palustris. They mine the leaves of their host plant. Young larva create a long, irregular gallery in a basal leaf. Older larvae live freely in the hearth of the plant in a white silken tube. The larvae have a light reddish grey body and a brown head. They can be found from June to July.

References

Moths described in 1849
Yponomeutidae
Moths of Europe